Drisht Castle is a ruined castle above the modern Albanian village of Drisht, medieval Drivastum, in the municipal unit Postribë, Shkodër County, Albania.

The earliest traces of fortifications date to the late Neolithic era. In the 9th century, it was part of the defences of the Zeta principality.

Part of castle was built in the 13th century during the Byzantine rule. The current walls and towers date to 1396–1478 during the Venetian era.  In the 14th century the castle became independent of Shkodra. In 1442 the castle was taken from Serbian Despot Đurađ Branković by the Venetian forces. It finally fell to the Ottomans during the massive siege of Shkodra in 1478.

There are the remains of 11 houses inside the castle walls.

References

Sources

Further reading 
 

Buildings and structures completed in the 13th century
Castles in Albania
Ruined castles in Albania
Buildings and structures in Shkodër